The Wind Chimes is a video album by Mike Oldfield released in 1988 on VHS and Laserdisc by Virgin. It features the full video album for 1987's Islands along with a number of Oldfield's other music videos from the 1980s.

It has since been released on DVD as a special feature of Elements – The Best of Mike Oldfield.

Track listing 
All tracks written by Mike Oldfield except "Shine" lyrics written by Mike Oldfield & Jon Anderson.
 "The Wind Chimes (Parts one & two)"
 "North Point"
 "Islands"
 "The Time Has Come"
 "Flying Start"
 "Magic Touch"
 "Five Miles Out"
 "Moonlight Shadow"
 "Shine"
 "Shadow on the Wall"
 "Pictures in the Dark"

References 

Mike Oldfield video albums
1988 video albums
Music video compilation albums
1988 compilation albums
Virgin Records video albums
Virgin Records compilation albums